This article lists the heads of state of Montenegro, from the establishment of the Prince-Bishopric of Montenegro to the present day.

The list includes the heads of state of the independent monarchies; Prince-Bishopric of Montenegro, Principality of Montenegro and Kingdom of Montenegro, as well as Socialist Republic of Montenegro, a constituent country of the Socialist Federal Republic of Yugoslavia and heads of state of the Republic of Montenegro (1992–2006), a constituent country of the Federal Republic of Yugoslavia / State Union of Serbia and Montenegro. Between 1943 and 1974, Montenegro's head of state was the speaker of the Montenegrin parliament.

Monarchy

Prince-Bishopric of Montenegro (1696–1852)

Principality of Montenegro (1852–1910)

Kingdom of Montenegro (1910–1918)

Republic

Socialist Republic of Montenegro (1943–1992)
SR Montenegro within Democratic Federal Yugoslavia and Socialist Federal Republic of Yugoslavia.

Republic of Montenegro (1992–2006)
Republic of Montenegro within Federal Republic of Yugoslavia and the State Union of Serbia and Montenegro.

Montenegro (independent country, 2006–present)
Montenegro became an independent state on 3 June 2006.

See also
List of rulers of Montenegro
President of Montenegro
List of presidents of Montenegro
Prime Minister of Montenegro
List of heads of state of Yugoslavia
President of Serbia and Montenegro

Notes

External links
 List of Montenegrin heads of state and government
 The President of Montenegro

Montenegro

Heads of state